Nico Greetham (born March 3, 1995) is an American actor and dancer. He played Calvin Maxwell in the television series Power Rangers Ninja Steel and as Nick in the musical film The Prom.

Background
Greetham is a native of Woodbridge, Virginia, and attended Osbourn Park High School. His parents are both doctors. His father is of Scottish descent and his mother is of Colombian descent. He has two sisters.

Greetham was a gymnast as a child, but sustained an injury at age eight that forced him to stop practicing the sport. After this, he began dancing, and aspired to compete on So You Think You Can Dance. In 2013, he successfully auditioned to appear the show's tenth season, in which he was a finalist. He moved to Los Angeles, and subsequently began acting.

Filmography

Film

Television series

Reality television

References

External links
 

1995 births
21st-century American dancers
21st-century American male actors
American male film actors
American male television actors
American people of Colombian descent
American people of Scottish descent
Living people
Male actors from Virginia
Osbourn Park High School alumni
People from Woodbridge, Virginia
So You Think You Can Dance (American TV series) contestants
Hispanic and Latino American male actors
Hispanic and Latino American dancers